Samantha Chang may refer to:

 Samantha Chang (soccer) (born 2000), Canadian soccer player
 Lan Samantha Chang (born 1965), American author